Homonota taragui is a species of gecko. It is endemic to Argentina.

References

Homonota
Reptiles of Argentina
Endemic fauna of Argentina
Reptiles described in 2013